Mountain View may refer to the following places in New Mexico:
Mountain View, Chaves County, New Mexico, an unincorporated community
Mountain View, Cibola County, New Mexico, a census-designated place
Mountain View, Luna County, New Mexico, a census-designated place